NSSA may refer to:

 National Scholastic Surfing Association
 National School Sailing Association, formed in the UK in 1961
 National Space Science Agency
 National Sportscasters and Sportswriters Association, now National Sports Media Association
 National Skeet Shooting Association
 North-South Skirmish Association
 OSPF Not-So-Stubby Area